QuickSpot is a video game for the Nintendo DS developed by Namco Bandai. The game is designed similar to games such as Brain Age which uses simple brain teaser to exercise reflexes and brain function. It is a part of Nintendo's Touch! Generations brand and is the first in the Unō no Tatsujin series. A sequel, titled titled Unou no Tatsujin Soukai! Machigai Museum 2, was released exclusively in Japan on March 1, 2007. An updated and renewed version of the game, titled QuickSpot: Master of the Right Brain, was developed by Bandai Namco Studios and published by Bandai Namco Entertainment for Nintendo Switch. It released on April 22, 2021 in Japan and on January 6, 2022 in the west.

Gameplay
The game projects two images, the correct one on the top screen, and an error filled one on the bottom screen. Comparing the two images, the player has to locate and find the inaccuracies or changes from the top screen to the touch screen.

This game is based on the traditional game spot the difference. GamePro.com described the game "like a mix between Where's Waldo and the Hidden Pictures section in Highlights magazine".

The players use none of the face buttons or D-Pad on the DS. The entire game is played using the touch screen and stylus. The player draws a circle using the stylus when the player spots the difference between the top image on the bottom screen. In some instances, the built in microphone is used.

Development and release
It was announced on the website GoNintendo that the game would be localized for North America, and was released on March 19, 2007, 13 months after the Japanese launch. An early review of this game on GameSpot gave it a score of 6.3. The North American version also adds references to other Namco franchises like Pac-Man, Mappy, and Mr. Driller.

Notes

References

External links
American website
Korea website
GoNintendo announces QuickSpot for US
1up preview
GamePro.com preview
Sliliconera.com preview
GameSpy QuickSpot page
IGN QuickSpot page
GameSpot.com Gamepage with review

Namco games
Nintendo DS games
Nintendo DS-only games
2006 video games
Puzzle video games
Video games developed in Japan

ja:右脳の達人シリーズ#右脳の達人 爽解!まちがいミュージアム